Biddlestone is a village and civil parish in Northumberland, England. In the early 21st Century several of Northumberland's least populated parishes were merged to form slightly larger units. Biddlestone was merged with Alwinton, the enlarged parish having a population of 177 in 2011.

Governance 
Biddlestone is in the parliamentary constituency of Berwick-upon-Tweed.

Landmarks 
Biddlestone Roman Catholic Chapel is a Grade II* listed building, and is all that now remains of the former mansion Biddlestone Hall.

References

External links

Villages in Northumberland